The 2020 Cal Poly Mustangs football team represented California Polytechnic State University in the 2020–21 NCAA Division I FCS football season. The Mustangs were led by 1st-year head coach Beau Baldwin and played their home games at Alex G. Spanos Stadium as members of the Big Sky Conference.

On March 29, 2021, Cal Poly announced that it would opt out of the remainder of the 2021 spring season, citing safety issues related to the COVID-19 pandemic and numerous injuries to players.

Previous season
The Mustangs finished the 2019 season 3–8, 2–6 in Big Sky play to finish in a tie for ninth place.

Preseason

Polls
On July 23, 2020, during the virtual Big Sky Kickoff, the Mustangs were predicted to finish tenth in the Big Sky by both the coaches and media.

Schedule
Cal Poly released their full schedule on September 20, 2019. The Mustangs had games scheduled against California and San Diego, which were later canceled before the start of the 2020 season.

Games against Northern Arizona (April 3), UC Davis (April 10), and Weber State (April 17) were canceled when the Mustangs opted out of the remainder of the season on March 29, 2021.

References

Cal Poly
Cal Poly Mustangs football seasons
College football winless seasons
Cal Poly Mustangs football